Lukeman may refer to:

Henry Augustus Lukeman (1872–1935), American sculptor
Frank Lukeman (1885–1946), Canadian Olympic athlete
Jack Lukeman (born 1973), Irish singer/songwriter
Noah Lukeman (born 1973), American writer and literary agent
Martin Lukeman (born 1985), English darts player

See also
Lukman, a surname